Yolande Plancke (22 July 1908 – 3 May 1991) was a French sprinter. She competed in the women's 100 metres at the 1928 Summer Olympics.

References

External links
 

1908 births
1991 deaths
Athletes (track and field) at the 1928 Summer Olympics
French female sprinters
Olympic athletes of France
Place of birth missing
20th-century French women
Olympic female sprinters